The Blithfield meteorite was found by Joseph Legree in Blithfield Township, Renfrew County, Ontario and measured about  x  x . The main mass is now in the Canadian National collection, Ottawa. Blithfield is an enstatite chondrite, a group of very unusual meteorites that were formed in a very reducing atmosphere. It is a breccia, one of only five known enstatite chondrite breccias.

See also
 Glossary of meteoritics
 Meteorite find

References

Meteorites found in Canada
1910 in Ontario